Hystricothrips is a genus of thrips in the family Phlaeothripidae.

Species
 Hystricothrips africanus
 Hystricothrips phasgonura

References

Phlaeothripidae
Thrips
Thrips genera